The Open International Féminin de Montpellier is a tournament for professional female tennis players played on outdoor clay courts. The event is classified as a $60,000 ITF Circuit event and has been held in Montpellier, France, since 2006.

Past finals

Singles

Doubles

External links
 ITF search
 Official website 

ITF Women's World Tennis Tour
Clay court tennis tournaments
Tennis tournaments in France
Recurring sporting events established in 2006
2006 establishments in France